The 49th Brigade was a formation of British Army. It was part of the new army also known as Kitchener's Army. It was assigned to the 16th (Irish) Division and served on the Western Front during the First World War.

Formation
The infantry battalions did not all serve at once, but all were assigned to the brigade during the war.
7th Battalion, Royal Irish Fusiliers
9th Battalion, Royal Irish Fusiliers
7th Battalion, Royal Inniskilling Fusiliers
8th Battalion, Royal Inniskilling Fusiliers
2nd Battalion, Royal Irish Regiment
7th Battalion, Royal Irish Regiment
34th Battalion, London Regiment
7th Battalion, King's Royal Rifle Corps
5th Battalion, Oxfordshire and Buckinghamshire Light Infantry
13th Battalion, Duke of Cornwall's Light Infantry
7th Battalion, Royal Dublin Fusiliers
6/7th Battalion, Royal Scots Fusiliers
18th Battalion, Gloucestershire Regiment
6th Battalion, Somerset Light Infantry
49th Machine Gun Company
49th Trench Mortar Battery

References

Infantry brigades of the British Army in World War I